Tejakula is a district (kecamatan) in the regency of Buleleng in northern Bali, Indonesia.

References

Districts of Bali